William Anastasi (b. Philadelphia, Pennsylvania, 1933) is an American visual artist working in a wide range of media including drawing, painting, sculpture, photographic works, and text.  He has lived and worked in New York City since the early 1960s and is known as "one of the most underrated conceptual artists of his generation".

His first solo exhibition took place in 1964 at the Betty Parsons gallery following a chance meeting with Philip Guston who recommended his work to Parsons. Following this he had a number of exhibition at the Dwan Gallery from 1965 to 1970. In his early career, Anastasi was largely influenced by Marcel Duchamp, whose work he first saw at the Philadelphia Museum of Art during his teens.

His work is predominantly abstract and conceptual. Early works such as Relief (1961) and Issue (1966) incorporate the use of industrial and construction materials. His works are held by the Metropolitan Museum of Art, the Museum of Modern Art, the Guggenheim Museum, the Whitney Museum, the Walker Art Center, the National Gallery of Art, and the Art Institute of Chicago. In 2010 Anastasi was awarded the Foundation for Contemporary Arts John Cage Award, an unrestricted grant awarded biennially.

Currently exhibited works include "Nine Polaroid Photographs of a Mirror", currently at the Metropolitan Museum of Art. In 2007, he took part in the artistic performance "Blind Date"  at the White Box Gallery in New York. In the performance, he and fellow artist Lucio Pozzi both drew dozens of artistic pieces blindfolded in an 8 hour long artistic duel.

In his early career, Anastasi was largely influenced by Marcel Duchamp, who inspired his shows at the Dwan Gallery from 1965 to 1970.

Anastasi was a close friend of composer John Cage who he first met in 1965 when Cage heard that Anastasi was preparing an exhibition titled 'Sound Objects' and was interested in learning more. In 1977 Cage and Anastasi began playing chess daily Anastasi wrote the memoir The Cage Dialogues about their friendship.

References

External links
 William Anastasi's page on the web site of his dealer, Sandra Gering Inc.
 Print Retrospective Exhibition
Brooklyn Rail In Conversation William Anastasi with Phong Bui

20th-century American painters
20th-century American male artists
American male painters
21st-century American painters
21st-century American male artists
Artists from Philadelphia
American people of Italian descent
1933 births
Living people